In Greek mythology, Memphis, daughter of river-god Nilus, accordingly a Naiad Nymph. She was the wife to Epaphus and mother of Libya and Anippe or Lysianassa. She and her husband were the legendary founders of Memphis, which bears her name. Some writers called Epaphus' wife Cassiopeia.

Argive genealogy

Notes

References 
 Gaius Julius Hyginus, Fabulae from The Myths of Hyginus translated and edited by Mary Grant. University of Kansas Publications in Humanistic Studies. Online version at the Topos Text Project.
 Pseudo-Apollodorus, The Library with an English Translation by Sir James George Frazer, F.B.A., F.R.S. in 2 Volumes, Cambridge, MA, Harvard University Press; London, William Heinemann Ltd. 1921. . Online version at the Perseus Digital Library.
 Tzetzes, John, Scolia eis Lycophroon, edited by Christian Gottfried Müller, Sumtibus F.C.G. Vogelii, 1811. Internet Archive.

Naiads
Children of Nilus
 Queens in Greek mythology